Gibe may refer to:

 Gibe (woreda), a district in Southern Nations, Nationalities, and Peoples' Region, Ethiopia 
 Gibe River, located in southwestern Ethiopia
 Gibe region, the drainage area south of this river
 Bob Gibe (1928–2005), American Olympic swimmer

See also
 Jibe, a sailing maneuver
 Gybe (disambiguation)